UEM Group Berhad (formerly United Engineers Malaysia Berhad) or UEM Group is a Malaysian engineering-based infrastructure and services company with four key businesses namely Expressways; Township & Property Development; Engineering & Construction; and Asset & Facility Management. UEM Group has been a 100% subsidiary of Khazanah Nasional Berhad since 2001. UEM Group has assets of more than US$5.3 billion (RM21.4 billion), with shareholders' funds standing in excess of US$1.9 billion (RM7.8 billion) as the end of December 2020.

History 
The company was incorporated in 1966 as United Engineers (M) Bhd.

In 2001, it became a wholly owned subsidiary of Khazanah Nasional Berhad, the sovereign wealth fund of Malaysia.

UEM Group of companies

Mercu UEM

Mercu UEM, a 29-storey commercial office building is the main headquarters of the UEM Group. It is located at KL Sentral, Kuala Lumpur.

References

  UEM Group Berhad corporate website, 20 May 2021

 
1966 establishments in Malaysia
Conglomerate companies of Malaysia
Construction and civil engineering companies of Malaysia
Government-owned companies of Malaysia
Malaysian companies established in 1966
Construction and civil engineering companies established in 1966
Privately held companies of Malaysia